Amyotrophic lateral sclerosis 2 chromosomal region candidate gene 8 protein also known as calcium-response factor (CaRF) is a protein that in humans is encoded by the ALS2CR8 gene.

Knocking out the Carf (Als2cr8) gene in mice results in learning associated deficits. Furthermore, Carf has been shown to function as a transcription factor that regulates the expression of BDNF.

References

External links

Further reading